Vinca (Latin: vincire "to bind, fetter") is a genus of flowering plants in the family Apocynaceae, native to Europe, northwest Africa and southwest Asia. The English name periwinkle is shared with the related genus Catharanthus (and also with the common seashore mollusc, Littorina littorea).

Description

The flowers, produced through most of the growing season, are salverform (like those of Phlox), simple,  broad, with five usually violet (occasionally white) petals joined together at the base to form a tube. The fruit consists of a pair of divergent follicles; the dry fruit dehisces along one rupture site to release seeds.

Gardens
Two of the species, Vinca major and Vinca minor, are extensively cultivated as a flowering evergreen ornamental plant. Because the plants are low and spread quickly, they are often used as groundcover in garden landscapes and container gardens. They are also traditionally used in older cemeteries as an evergreen maintenance-free ground cover.   Many cultivars are available, with different plant, leaf, and flower colors, sizes, and habits.

Invasive plant species
Although attractive, both Vinca major and Vinca minor may be invasive in some regions where they are introduced species because the rapid spreading chokes out native plant species and alters habitats. Areas affected include parts of Australia, New Zealand, Canada, and the United States, especially coastal California.

Medicinal use 
The vinca alkaloids include at least 86 alkaloids extracted from plants in the genus Vinca.  The chemotherapy agent vincristine is extracted from a closely related species, Catharanthus roseus, and is used to treat some leukemias, lymphomas, and childhood cancers, as well as several other types of cancer and some non-cancerous conditions.  Vinblastine is a chemical analogue of vincristine and is also used to treat various forms of cancer. Dimeric alkaloids such as vincristine and vinblastine are produced by the coupling the smaller indole alkaloids vindoline and catharanthine. In addition, the nootropic agent vincamine is derived from Vinca minor.  Vinorelbine, a newer semi-synthetic chemotherapeutic agent, is used in the treatment of non-small-cell lung cancer and is prepared either from the natural products leurosine or catharanthine and vindoline, in both cases by first preparing anhydrovinblastine.

Species
Accepted species:
 Vinca difformis Pourr. – Azores, western and central Mediterranean
 Vinca erecta Regel & Schmalh. – Afghanistan, Kyrgyzstan, Tajikistan, Uzbekistan
 Vinca herbacea Waldst. & Kit. – central, eastern and southeastern Europe; Middle East
 Vinca ispartensis Koyuncu & Ekşi – Turkey
 Vinca major L. – southern Europe, Turkey, Syria, Caucasus; introduced to and established in New Zealand, California, British Isles, central Europe, Ukraine, North Africa, south China, Canary Islands, Madeira, North America, Mexico, Colombia, Venezuela, Peru, Costa Rica, Guatemala
 Vinca minor L. – central and southeastern Europe, Ukraine, Caucasus; introduced to and established in British Isles, Scandinavia, Portugal, Turkey, south China, North America, New Zealand
 Vinca soneri Koyuncu – Turkey

References

External links

 
Apocynaceae genera
Groundcovers
Taxa named by Carl Linnaeus
Rhizomatous plants
Stoloniferous plants
Subshrubs